Seenu may refer to:

Seenu Atoll, an administrative division of the Maldives
Seenu, the 17th consonant of the Thaana abugaida used in Dhivehi
Seenu (1999 film), a South Indian Telugu film
Seenu (2000 film), a Tamil film starring Karthik